WIPX may refer to:

 WIPX-TV, a television station (channel 28, virtual 63) licensed to serve Indianapolis, Indiana, United States
 WIPX-LD, a low-power television station (channel 34) licensed to serve Indianapolis, Indiana